Joseph Rosenblatt (December 26, 1933 – March 11, 2019) was a Canadian poet who lived in Qualicum Beach, British Columbia. He won Canada's Governor-General's Award and British Columbia's B.C. Book Prize for poetry. He was also a talented artist, whose "line drawings, paintings, and sketches often illustrate his own and other poets’ books of poetry."

Life and writing

The son of Jewish immigrants from Poland, Rosenblatt was born and raised in Toronto, Ontario, where he grew up in the city's Kensington Market area and attended Lansdowne Public School. Later he went to Central Technical School, but dropped out and worked in a variety of blue-collar jobs. In 1956 he became a laborer for the Canadian Pacific Railway.

A socialist, he became a Trotskyist, joining the Socialist Education League in Toronto. He ran in the 1958 municipal election, for city council in Ward 1 (Riverdale), receiving 521 votes.

He began seriously writing poetry in the early 1960s. "He became interested in writing through his association with the worker poet Milton Acorn in the early sixties and the metaphysical poetry of Gwendolyn MacEwen." He "got his start with the help of other poets: Milton Acorn, Al Purdy and Earle Birney."

His first book, The L.S.D. Leacock, was published in 1966. In the same year he received a Canada Council grant that allowed him to quit his railway job and write full-time.

Since then, in his 40-year career, "Rosenblatt has written more than 20 books of poetry, several autobiographical works and his poems have appeared in over thirty anthologies of Canadian poetry.... He has traveled widely giving readings of his poems in Europe, Canada and the United States."

Books in Canada wrote of him in 1988 that, "street smart, water wise, heaven bent, Joe Rosenblatt is a talented man, fisher of gods, and a school in himself. He makes you feel things that are hard to touch: bee fur, tadpoles, and the human heart."

Rosenblatt summed up his philosophy of writing in this way:

I write to escape hyper reality – genocide of man, elephants and fish – the death of the ozone layer, the industrial  of the earth – My affordable opiate is my Muse. It allows me to float into a dream state and create an escapist literature. Let the prose-fanciers, the dog people as opposed to poetic feline fancier – indulge in grim reality. The very thought of reality gives me hives.

Rosenblatt died on March 11, 2019, shortly after advance reviews of his newest poetry collection Bite Me! Musings on Monsters and Mayhem began to appear in media.

Recognition

A 1976 book of selected poems, Top Soil, won Rosenblatt the Governor General's Award in 1976.

A decade later, another book of selected poems, Poetry Hotel, won him the B.C. Book Prize for Poetry (now the Dorothy Livesay Poetry Prize) in 1986.

"Rosenblatt has been writer in residence at several Canadian universities, as well as the University of Rome and the University of Bologna." "Several bilingual volumes of his poetry have been published in Italian with translations by Prof. Alfredo Rizzardi of the University of Bologna, and Ada Donati of Rome" (one being a book of his sea sonnets, A Tentacled Mother). "His poems have also been ... translated into French, Dutch, Swedish, and Spanish."

Publications

Poetry
 The LSD Leacock. Toronto: Coach House Press, 1966.
 Winter of the Luna Moth. House of Anansi, Toronto, 1968
 Bumblebee Dithyramb. Press Porcepic, Erin 1970
 Blind Photographer. Press Porcepic, Erin, 1974
 Dream Craters. Press Porcepic, Erin, 1975
 Virgins & Vampires. McClelland & Stewart, Toronto, 1975
 Top Soil, Selected Poems (1962–1975). Press Porcepic, Erin, 1976
 Loosely Tied Hands. Black Moss Press, Windsor, 1978
 The Sleeping Lady. Exile Editions, Toronto, 1980
 Brides of the Stream. Oolichan Books, Lantzville, B.C., 1983
 Poetry Hotel, Selected Poems (1963-1985). McClelland & Stewart, Toronto, 1985
 A Tentacled Mother. (in the original plus new sonnets) Exile Editions, Toronto, Oct. 1995
 The Rosenblatt Reader. (selected poems and prose, 1962–1995) Exile Editions, Toronto, 1995.
 The Voluptuous Gardener. (new poetry and selected drawings from Carleton University Art Gallery permanent collection) Beach Holme Press, Vancouver, 1996.
 Parrot fever. collages by Michel Christensen. Toronto: Exile Editions, 2002.
 The lunatic muse, Joe Rosenblatt ; edited by David Berry. Toronto: Exile Editions, 2007.
 Dog, Joe Rosenblatt & Catherine Owen ; photos by Karen Moe. Toronto: Mansfield Press, 2008.
 Bite Me! Musings on Monsters and Mayhem', The Porcupine's Quill, 2019.

Fiction
 Tommy Fry & the Ant Colony. Black Moss, Windsor, 1970
 Escape From the Glue Factory. (autobiographical fiction) Exile Editions, Toronto, 1985
 The Kissing Goldfish of Siam. (autobiographical fiction) Exile Editions, Toronto, 1989
 Beds & Consenting Dreamers''. (an experimental novel) Oolichan Books, Lantzville, B.C. 1994

Except where noted, bibliographic information courtesy University of Toronto.

See also

Canadian literature
Canadian poetry
List of Canadian poets

References

External links
 
 Canadian Poetry Online : Joe Rosenblatt - Biography, 5 poems (A Blushing Ague, The Boys Are Stepping Out Tonight, My Little Messenger, Combustion, Padding Through the Pampas Grass), and 20 drawings/illustrations.

1933 births
2019 deaths
20th-century Canadian poets
Canadian male poets
20th-century Canadian painters
Canadian male painters
21st-century Canadian painters
Governor General's Award-winning poets
Artists from Toronto
Writers from Toronto
Sonneteers
20th-century Canadian male writers
Canadian Trotskyists
Jewish Canadian writers
Canadian people of Polish-Jewish descent